This is a list of earthquakes in 2012. Only earthquakes of magnitude 6 or above are included, unless they result in damage or casualties, or are notable for some other reason.  All dates are listed according to UTC time. Two huge 8 magnitude earthquakes (8.6 and 8.2) struck Indonesia in April, but caused little damage, and no tsunami. The deadliest quake occurred in Iran, while other destructive tremors were observed in Philippines, China, or Afghanistan.

Compared to other years

Overall

By death toll

 Note: At least 10 casualties

By magnitude

 Note: At least 7.0 magnitude

By month

January

  A magnitude 6.8 earthquake struck Izu Islands, Japan, on January 1, at a depth of 348.5 km.
  A magnitude 5.5 earthquake struck Peravia Province, Dominican Republic, on January 5, at a depth of 39.8 km. One person died of a cardiac arrest in Santo Domingo, as well as minor damage was reported.
  A magnitude 6.6 earthquake struck Santa Cruz Islands, on January 8, at a depth of 38.9 km.
  A magnitude 7.2 earthquake struck off the west coast of northern Sumatra, Indonesia on January 11, at a depth of 20.5 km.
  A magnitude 6.6 earthquake struck off the South Shetland Islands, Antarctica on January 15, at a depth of 10.0 km.
  A magnitude 6.2 earthquake struck off the South Shetland Islands, Antarctica on January 15, at a depth of 14.8 km.
  A magnitude 6.3 earthquake struck off the coast of Chiapas, Mexico  on January 21, at a depth of 79.5 km.
  A magnitude 6.0 earthquake struck the South Sandwich Islands region on January 22, at a depth of 13 km.
  A magnitude 6.2 earthquake struck the Biobío Region, Chile on January 23, at a depth of 29.7 km.
  A magnitude 6.3 earthquake struck near Fiji on January 24, at a depth of 582.8 km.
  A magnitude 5.2 earthquake struck Yamanashi Prefecture, Japan on January 27, at a depth of 36.3 km. One person was injured.
  A magnitude 6.3 earthquake struck near the coast of Central Peru on January 30, at a depth of 39.2 km. At least 119 people were injured as well as several buildings damaged.

February

  A magnitude 7.1 earthquake struck near island of Efate, Vanuatu on February 2, at a depth of 23.1 km. This was later followed by a magnitude 6.0 aftershock, at a depth of 21.7 km.
  A magnitude 6.1 earthquake struck near Isangel, Vanuatu on February 5, at a depth of 163.4 km.
  A magnitude 6.0 earthquake struck near island of Efate, Vanuatu on February 5, at a depth of 10.3 km.
  A magnitude 6.7 earthquake struck near island of Negros, and Cebu, Philippines on February 6, at a depth of 20 km, killing 105 people.
  A magnitude 6.0 earthquake struck near the island of Negros, on February 6, at a depth of 15 km.
  A magnitude 6.0 earthquake struck west coast of Quepos, on February 13, at a depth of 11 km.
  A magnitude 6.0 earthquake struck east of Honshū, on February 14, at a depth of 10 km.
  A magnitude 6.4 earthquake struck near Kirakira, on February 14, at a depth of 54.7 km.
  A magnitude 6.0 earthquake struck off the coast of Oregon, on February 15, at a depth of 10 km.
  A magnitude 6.0 earthquake struck Chiapas on February 16.
  A magnitude 6.7 earthquake struck southwestern Siberia, Russia on February 26, at a depth of 11.7 km.

March

  A magnitude 6.6 earthquake struck off New Caledonia on the March 3, at a depth of 15.2 km.
  A magnitude 6.1 earthquake struck northern Sasowa, near Añatuya, on March 5, at a depth of 550 km.
  A magnitude 6.7 earthquake struck Vanuatu, near Isangel, on March 9, at a depth of 31.7 km.
  A magnitude 6.9 earthquake struck near Kushiro, Hokkaido, Japan, on March 14, at a depth of 26.6 km.
  A magnitude 6.1 earthquake struck offshore Chiba Prefecture, Japan, on March 14, at a depth of 9.5 km. One person died of a heart attack.
  A magnitude 6.2 earthquake struck Papua New Guinea, near Kimbe, New Britain, on March 14, at a depth of 47.8 km.
  A magnitude 6.2 earthquake struck near Abepura, Indonesia, on March 20, at a depth of 67 km.
  A magnitude 7.4 earthquake struck Oaxaca, Mexico, on March 20, at a depth of 20 km, killing 2 people.
  A magnitude 6.6 earthquake struck New Guinea, Papua New Guinea on March 21, at a depth of 105.9 km.
  A magnitude 7.1 earthquake hit  Chile, near Talca, on March 25, at a depth of 34.8 km. One person died of a heart attack.
   A magnitude 6.0 earthquake struck maritime territory of Mexico, between Acapulco and Clipperton Island, on March 26, at a depth of 9 km.
  A magnitude 6.0 earthquake hit near the east coast of Honshū Japan, on March 27, at a depth of 10 km.

April

  A magnitude 6.0 earthquake struck near Cuajinicuilapa, Mexico on April 2, at a depth of 9.1 km.
  A magnitude 6.2 earthquake struck Papua New Guinea, near Taron, on April 6, at a depth of 85.4 km.
  A magnitude 8.6 earthquake hit Indonesia, off northern Sumatra, on April 11 at a depth of 22.9 km followed by several aftershocks including an 8.2. Ten people were killed and several others injured.
  A magnitude 6.0 earthquake struck near the southeast coast of Taiwan on April 11 at a depth of 10 km.
  A magnitude 6.5 earthquake hit  Mexico, near Michoacán, on April 11, at a depth of 20 km.
  A magnitude 6.2 struck Baja California, Mexico on April 12 followed by a strong aftershock of 6.9.
  A magnitude 6.2 earthquake hit  Drake Passage, near Argentina and Chile, on April 14, at a depth of 9.9 km.
  A magnitude 6.5 earthquake struck near Isangel, Vanuatu, on April 14 at a depth of 8.0 km.
  A magnitude 6.2 struck off the coast of Sumatra, Indonesia, on April 15 at a depth of 15.2 km.
  A magnitude 6.7 earthquake struck Chile, near Valparaíso, on April 17, at a depth of 37 km. One person died of a heart attack and another due to the loss of power at a local hospital.
  A magnitude 6.8 earthquake struck Papua New Guinea, about 137 km north of Lae, on April 17 at a depth of 208.2 km.
  A magnitude 6.2 earthquake struck east of the South Sandwich Islands, on April 17 at a depth of 1 km.
  A magnitude 6.6 earthquake struck near the north coast of Papua, Indonesia, on April 21 at a depth of 29.8 km.
  A magnitude 6.7 earthquake hit  Tonga, near Neiafu, on April 28, at a depth of 129.4 km.

May

  A magnitude 6.0 earthquake struck offshore of Chiapas in Mexico on May 1, at a depth of 14 km.
  A magnitude 5.6 earthquake struck the western part of Azerbaijan on May 7, at a depth of 23 km. Two people lost their lives — one was crushed by a wall, while the other had a heart attack.
  A magnitude 5.9 earthquake struck Tajikistan on May 12, at a depth of 10 km. One person was killed.
  A magnitude 6.2 earthquake struck near the Peru-Chile border on May 14, at a depth of 98.3 km.
  A magnitude 6.0 earthquake struck the New Britain region of Papua New Guinea on May 16, at a depth of 154 km.
  A magnitude 6.2 earthquake struck about 600 km off the coast of Aisén Region of Chile on May 18, at a depth of 10 km.
  A magnitude 6.1 earthquake struck Emilia region on May 20, at a depth of 5.1 km. Seven people died and over 50 others were injured.
  A magnitude 6.4 earthquake struck about 180 km off the east coast of Honshū Japan on May 20, at a depth of 15 km.
  A magnitude 5.6 earthquake struck 24 km west of Bulgaria's capital Sofia on May 22, at a depth of 9.4 km. A woman who suffered a heart attack was the only indirect fatality.
  A magnitude 6.1 earthquake struck about 100 km northeast of Hokkaido Japan on May 23, at a depth of 40.7 km.
  A magnitude 6.2 earthquake hit 600 km northwest of Tromsø Norway on May 24, at a depth of 8.8 km.
  A magnitude 6.0 earthquake struck about 225 km northwest of Iwo Jima, in the Bonin Islands region of Japan on May 26, at a depth of 472.6 km.
  A magnitude 6.7 earthquake struck about 117 km east of Santiago del Estero, Argentina on May 28, at a depth of 588 km.
  A magnitude 5.8 earthquake struck Medolla, Italy on May 29, at a depth of 9.6 km. Twenty people died.

June

  A magnitude 6.0 earthquake struck 8 km southeast of Yacuiba, Bolivia and 54 km north-northeast of Tartagal, Salta, Argentina on 2 June, at a depth of 519.6 km.
  A magnitude 6.3 earthquake struck southern pacific coast of Costa Rica Punta Burica, on June 3, at a depth of 10 km.
  A magnitude 6.2 earthquake struck in the Pacific Ocean 346 km south of David, Panama on 4 June, at a depth of 7 km.
  A magnitude 6.4 earthquake struck in the Pacific Ocean 323 km south of David, Panama on 4 June, at a depth of 5.9 km.
  A magnitude 6.0 earthquake struck Arequipa, Peru on 7 June, at a depth of 99.7 km.
  Two earthquakes measuring 5.4 and 5.7 struck Afghanistan on June 11, collapsing buildings and triggering landslides, one of which buried the village of Sayi Hazara. 75 people were reported dead as a result of the landslide.
  A magnitude 6.1 earthquake hit the Philippines near Dagupan, Luzon, on June 16, at a depth of 35.3 km.
  A magnitude 6.4 earthquake struck in the Pacific Ocean 28 km southeast of Ofunato, Japan on 18 June, at a depth of 36 km.
  A magnitude 6.0 quake struck 24 km northwest of Macquarie Island Australia, on June 22, at a depth of 9.9 km.
  A magnitude 6.1 quake struck near the east coast of Kamchatka on June 24, at a depth of 17 km.
  A magnitude 5.5 earthquake struck the Sichuan–Yunnan border region of China on June 24, at a depth of 9.3 km (5.8 miles). At least four people died, and more than 150 others were injured.
  A magnitude 6.3 earthquake struck Northern Xinjiang on June 30, at a depth of 10 km.

July

  A magnitude 6.3 earthquake struck New Zealand, near the Cook Strait, on 3 July at a depth of 236.1 km.
  A magnitude 6.3 earthquake struck near Vanuatu, on July 6, at a depth of 162.7 km.
  A magnitude 6.0 earthquake struck 268 km East of Kurilsk, Russia, on July 8, at a depth of 20 km.
  A magnitude 6.0 earthquake struck Kuril Islands on July 20, at a depth of 22.7 km.
  A magnitude 6.3 earthquake struck Kuril Islands on July 20.
  A magnitude 4.9 earthquake struck Yangzhou on July 20, at a depth of 13.9 km. 1 death is confirmed.
  A magnitude 6.4 earthquake struck Simeulue, Indonesia, on July 25, at a depth of 22 km. One man died while fleeing his home.
  A magnitude 6.5 earthquake struck Solomon Islands, on July 25, at a depth of 22.9 km.
  A magnitude 6.7 earthquake struck 386 km (240 mi) NE of Rodrigues, 976 km (606 mi) ENE of Mauritius on July 26, at a depth of 9.8 km.
  A magnitude 6.5 earthquake struck near New Ireland, Papua New Guinea on July 26, at a depth of 43.4 km.
   A magnitude 6.0 earthquake struck Guatemala's Pacific Coast (Ocos) and felt in Chiapas, México on July 29, 2012, at a depth of 35.5 km.

August

  A magnitude 6.1 earthquake struck Central Peru on August 2, at a depth of 143.3 km.
  A magnitude 6.3 earthquake struck near New Ireland, Papua New Guinea, on August 2, at a depth of 70.6 km.
  A magnitude 6.2 earthquake struck 96 km southeast of Nikolski, Alaska on August 10, at a depth of 13.1 km.
  A magnitude 6.4 earthquake hit Iran, near Ahar, on August 11, at a depth of 9.9 km.
  A magnitude 6.3 earthquake hit Iran, near Tabriz, on August 11, at a depth of 9.8 km.
  A magnitude 7.7 earthquake hit the Sea of Okhotsk on August 14, at a depth of 625.9 km.
  A magnitude 6.3 earthquake struck Sulawesi, Indonesia, on August 18, at a depth of 19.9 km, killing six people.
  A magnitude 6.2 earthquake struck Papua New Guinea, on August 19, at a depth of 77.3 km.
  A magnitude 6.6 earthquake struck Molucca Sea, on August 26, at a depth of 91.9 km.
  A magnitude 7.4 earthquake struck offshore El Salvador, on August 26, at a depth of 20.3 km. It generated a 6-meter-high tsunami, injuring more than 40 people.
  A magnitude 6.8 earthquake struck Jan Mayen, on August 30, at a depth of 9.9 km.
  A magnitude 7.6 earthquake struck offshore the Philippines, near Guiuan, Samar on August 31, at a depth of 33 km. One person was killed and another injured.

September

  A magnitude 6.4 earthquake hit  Indonesia, near South of Java, on September 3, at a depth of 8.8 km.
  A magnitude 6.0 earthquake struck 190 km northwest of Sola, Vanuatu, on September 5, at a depth of 17.6 km.
  A magnitude 7.6 earthquake struck Nicoya Peninsula in the province of Guanacaste, Costa Rica, on September 5, at a depth of 35 km.
  Two quakes measuring 5.6 struck China's Yunnan Province on September 7, at a depth of 9.9 km. At least 81 deaths and 821 injuries were reported, with more than 20,000 homes damaged.
  A magnitude 6.1 earthquake struck off the north coast of Papua, Indonesia, on September 8, at a depth of 14.1 km.
  A magnitude 6.0 earthquake struck off the Kuril Islands, Russia, on September 9, at a depth of 58.7 km.
  A magnitude 6.2 earthquake struck the Kepulauan Mentawai Region, Indonesia, on September 14, at a depth of 19.8 km.
  A magnitude 6.3 earthquake struck the La Paz Mexico, on September 26, at a depth of 10.1 km.
  A magnitude 6.4 earthquake struck near the Tanaga Volcano, Alaska, on September 26, at a depth of 9.9 km.
  A magnitude 6.0 earthquake struck Pinotepa Nacional, Oaxaca, on September 29, at depth of 20 km.
  A magnitude 7.3 earthquake struck near Isnos, Colombia, on September 30, at a depth of 170 km.

October

 A magnitude 6.2 earthquake struck Miyako, on October 2, at depth of 9.7 km.
 A magnitude 6.0 earthquake struck offshore Mexico in the Gulf of California, on October 8, at depth of 9.9 km.
 A magnitude 6.3 earthquake struck offshore Indonesia in the Banda Sea, on October 8, at depth of 34.7 km.
 A magnitude 6.6 earthquake struck the Balleny Islands, Antarctica on October 9, at depth of 10.2 km.
 A magnitude 6.2 earthquake struck Los Andes, on October 11.
 A magnitude 6.7 earthquake struck Dobo, on October 12, at depth of 24.7 km.
 A magnitude 6.0 earthquake struck the Celebes Sea on October 17, at depth of 337.4 km.
 A magnitude 6.2 earthquake struck Vanuatu, on October 21, at depth of 35.6 km.
 A magnitude 6.0 struck Izu Islands, Japan, on October 23, at depth of 446 km.
 A magnitude 6.0 earthquake struck west of New Caledonia, on October 23, at a depth of 127 km.
 A magnitude 6.5 earthquake struck Hojancha, Costa Rica on October 24, at depth of 20.1 km.
 A magnitude 5.5 earthquake struck Mormanno, Italy, on October 25, at depth of 3.8 km. 1 indirect death was reported, along with moderate damage.
 A magnitude 7.8 earthquake struck the Haida Gwaii region, Canada, on October 28 at a depth of 20 km. One person died in a crash near a road that was closed because of a tsunami threat near Hawaii's northern coast. This was later followed by a magnitude 6.3 aftershock, at a depth of 8.2 km, and a magnitude 6.2 aftershock on October 29, at a depth of 10 km.

November 

 A magnitude 6.2 earthquake struck Java, Indonesia, on November 1, at depth of 142 km.
 A magnitude 6.4 earthquake struck Burgos, Philippines, on November 2, at depth of 54.5 km.
 A magnitude 6.0 earthquake struck Carlsberg Ridge, In the Yemen's maritime territory, on November 6, at depth of 10.2 km.
 A magnitude 7.4 earthquake struck off the coast of Guatemala, near Mexico, on November 7, at depth of 41.6 km, with 39 people dead.
 A magnitude 6.3 earthquake struck off the Vancouver Island region, Canada, on November 8, at a depth of 16.6 km.
 A magnitude 6.8 earthquake struck near Shwebo, Myanmar, on November 11, at a depth of 9.8 km, with at least 38 dead or missing.
 A magnitude 6.0 earthquake struck Central Peru, on November 11, at a depth of 100 km.
: A magnitude 6.0 earthquake struck Shwebo, Myanmar, on November 11, at a depth of 9.8 km.
  A magnitude 6.5 earthquake struck off the coast of Guatemala, near Mexico, on November 11, at depth of 27 km.
: A magnitude 6.4 earthquake struck Gulf of Alaska, United States, on November 12, at depth of 12 km.
 A magnitude 6.0 earthquake struck off the coast of Aisén Region, Chile, on November 13, at a depth of 9.7 km.
 A magnitude 6.1 earthquake struck Vallenar, Chile, on November 14, at a depth of 61.8 km.
 A magnitude 6.1 earthquake struck Guerrero, Mexico, on November 15, at a depth of 60.9 km.
 A magnitude 6.5 earthquake struck the Kuril Islands, Russia, on November 16, at a depth of 29.1 km.
 A magnitude 6.1 earthquake struck northeast of Tonga, on November 17, at a depth of 9.8 km.

December 

  A magnitude 6.4 earthquake struck Vanuatu on December 2, at a depth of 34.1 km.
  A magnitude 5.6 earthquake struck Zohan, Iran on December 5, at a depth of 5.6 km, with 9 people dead or missing.
  A magnitude 7.3 earthquake struck off the coast of Honshu, Japan on December 7, at a depth of 36.1 km. A small tsunami of 1m was recorded. 3 people were confirmed dead.
  A magnitude 6.2 earthquake struck off the coast of Honshu, Japan on December 7, at a depth of 29.2 km.
  A magnitude 6.3 earthquake struck the North Island of New Zealand on December 7, at a depth of 167.2 km.
  A magnitude 7.1 earthquake struck in the Banda Sea near Indonesia on December 10, at a depth of 159.3 km.
   A magnitude 6.4 earthquake struck off the coast of Baja California near Ensenada on December 14, at a depth of 10.1 km.
  A magnitude 6.1 earthquake struck the New Britain region, Papua New Guinea on December 15, at a depth of 52 km.
  A magnitude 6.1 earthquake struck Sulawesi, Indonesia on December 17, at a depth of 18.5 km.
  A magnitude 6.8 earthquake struck Vanuatu on December 21, at a depth of 207.9 km.
  A magnitude 6.0 earthquake struck near Papua New Guinea on December 29, at a depth of 10.1 km.

References

2012
 
2012